Crystal Valley Cemetery is a cemetery located on Plainview Place in Manitou Springs, Colorado.  Since its establishment in 1882, it has been the principal cemetery in Manitou Springs.  It is listed in the National Register of Historic Places.

Overview
The land for the cemetery was provided by Dr. Isaac Davis in 1882 and the cemetery was laid out that year. In 1890, the cemetery was established and graves from the original town cemetery on Pawnee Avenue were moved to the new cemetery. Since its establishment, it has served as Manitou Springs's principal cemetery. It is maintained by the Manitou Springs Parks Department.

It is arranged "in curvilinear fashion", following the local topography, and combines natural vegetation and landscaping, including gardens of irises, lilies, and roses. Its streets are lined with pairs of conifers and silver maples.

Enclosure and retaining walls are made from locally quarried green sandstone. The same material is used for several of the cemetery's buildings, including the chapel and maintenance building.

Architectural styles include Picturesque, Rustic, and Egyptian Revival. The Richards Mausoleum, made of green sandstone, is described as "probably the  example of Egyptian Revival architecture to be found in the state".

An unusual monument in the cemetery is that of Freddie Schnieder, who died in 1887 before he reached the age of 3. He "was laid to rest... beneath a Kinney cast iron grave fence designed to look like a child's bed. The round marble 'pillow' inscribed with Freddie's identification, and the cast iron tassels hanging from draped chains to suggest bed hangings provide additional visual interest."

Historical significance
According to the Colorado Preservation Office, the cemetery is "significant for architecture, landscape architecture, and for the important local persons interred there."  In 1982, it was added to the National Register of Historic Places.

Tours
Tours of the cemetery are conducted in the summers by reservation through Miramont Castle: "The guests will be given an introduction to Victorian mourning, their beliefs and superstitions by the Lady in Black."

Notable people
Charles Adams (1840–1885), was a Civil War general, Colorado Indian agent, and secretary to Territorial Governor Edward M. McCook.

Mabel Jane Willie, the first female mayor of Manitou Springs, is buried at the cemetery. Emma Crawford is interred at the cemetery. Every October coffin races are held in Manitou Springs in her name based upon the legend that her coffin slid down Red Mountain after a heavy rain. Another local legendary woman is Theresa M. Kenny (1859 Austria – 1943); She built and stuccoed her own mausoleum in the 1930s and enjoyed rocking a chair alongside her completed project.

Gallery

See also
 Manitou Springs Historic District
 List of Manitou Springs Historic District buildings

Notes

References

Further reading

External links

 

Cemeteries on the National Register of Historic Places in Colorado
Colorado State Register of Historic Properties
Manitou Springs, Colorado
National Register of Historic Places in El Paso County, Colorado